The Racine North Breakwater Light is a lighthouse located on Lake Michigan, connected via breakwater to Racine, Wisconsin. The light was deactivated in 1987 yet still stands in its original location, now a tourist destination.

History
In 1901, the fourth order Fresnel lens from the Racine Harbor Lighthouse was removed and placed in a new metal tower on the northern end of the harbor pier. This new metal tower was then named the Racine North Breakwater Light, completed November 23, 1901. The structure was made entirely of metal and painted completely white save for the lantern room which housed the Fresnel lens. In 1904 a  fog bell was mounted to the lighthouse, and the lantern room was finally constructed, a hexagonal pyramidal tower.

In 1933,  of telephone cables were laid down between Racine and the breakwater, allowing for the tower to be automated from the shore. In 1987, the lighthouse was scheduled to be torn down, but a public outcry stopped the demolition.

See also 
 Racine Reef Light
 Wind Point Light

References

External links
 

Lighthouses completed in 1904
Lighthouses in Wisconsin
1901 establishments in Wisconsin
Buildings and structures in Racine, Wisconsin